Brangas is a genus of butterflies in the family Lycaenidae.
The members (species) of this genus are found in the Neotropical realm.

The genus was erected by Jacob Hübner c. 1819

External links
Funet Taxonomy Distribution

Eumaeini
Lycaenidae of South America
Lycaenidae genera
Taxa named by Jacob Hübner